Class 90 may refer to:

British Rail Class 90
German Class 90 tank locomotives with a 0-6-2T wheel arrangement operated by the Deutsche Reichsbahn and its successor administrations, comprising:
 Class 90.0-2: Prussian T 9, LBE T 9, PKP Class TKi1
 Class 90.3: ČSD Class 312.7
 Class 90.10: BBÖ 30 (2-6-2T)
 Class 90.11: JDŽ Class 51 (2-6-2T)
 Class 90.64: various locomotives taken over in 1949 by the Deutsche Reichsbahn (GDR)
 Class 90.70: EWA IIIb